Film d'auteur (also called cinéma d'auteur) is an expression used to describe the films of a film director or a screenwriter which reflect their artistic personality. This term seeks before all to link the work of a filmmaker to preferred themes and the coherence of an innovative and singular style. It is, however, a subjective notion of which there is no rigorous definition. Film d'auteur is frequently grouped with "Cinéma d'art et d'essai" or research cinema.

Origin 
The notion of film d'auteur was born in France in the 1950s when critics influenced by the theories of Louis Delluc, Alexandre Astruc and André Bazin, who constituted the following Nouvelle Vague – notably François Truffaut – called their wish a cinema breaking the academicism of their elders (for example Jean Delannoy and Claude Autant-Lara) and inspired by American filmmakers such as Alfred Hitchcock, Howard Hawks and John Ford. In an article of the Cahiers du cinéma of 1955 in which he evokes Ali Baba by Jacques Becker, Truffaut defines the theoretical concept of "politique des auteurs" which consists in studying a film as the continuation of the aesthetic choices of a filmmaker and not as a work entirely apart, attributable to a precise genre or story. Consequently, being an auteur means that the director has full authority over his films. He surpasses technical constraints in order to define his own style. The auteur is therefore, according to Truffaut, the one who brands into his works original motifs which belong only to himself and no other. This concept, dominant in French critical discourse since the 1960s, makes the director the sole creator to the detriment of the screenwriter or co-screenwriter, producer, and technical team. This vision is contested and seen as rejected since the 1990s, notably by the French-American critic Noël Burch who judges it to be too limited and uniquely focused on form.

In Germany, film d'auteur is represented especially by the New German Cinema movement (Rainer Werner Fassbinder, Werner Herzog, Wim Wenders, etc.). According to them, the director must brand his vision and his style in his work, in the same manner as a writer in the field of literature: it is the metaphor of the "camera-pen". The film must therefore be considered as the work of an author rather than a simple entertainment product manufactured by the Hollywood "dream factory". The term "auteur" is used today in English to designate directors who have a style of their own or a distinctive vision.

In the United Kingdom, the idea of film d'auteur was also born in the 1950s with the critic-filmmakers of the review Sequence, admirative of the work of Jean Vigo and Jacques Prévert and close to the Jeunes gens en colère. Karel Reisz, Lindsay Anderson and Tony Richardson, founders of Free cinema, call for the re-founding of a cinema that breaks with the conventional workmanship of the majority British productions. The productions derived from it want to be more authentic, singular and anchored in a certain social reality. When Free Cinema was launched in 1956, Reisz declared: "We work outside the habitual framework of the industry and we have in common social concerns which we try to express in our films." The auteur is therefore an independent creator marked for his commitment and the acuteness of his outlook on society.

In Eastern Europe, some young auteurs, recognized in the international sphere for their innovative style or the accuracy of their social observation, began to emerge in the 1960s with the temporary appeasement of governance in some Communist states and the relative loosening of censorship committees (New Czechoslovak Wave, New Polish Cinema, etc.).

In the United States at the end of the 1960s the filmmakers of the new generation recognized themselves in the concept of auteur as defined by Truffaut and profited off the financial crisis within large studios to take power there and put themselves at the center of the conception and production of films, a position of which they had previously been deprived. The directors of the New Hollywood then claim total authority over the cinematographic works of which they shaped the artistic point of view. They tried in this way to affirm the coherence of their style.

In Denmark in the 1990s a radical process of re-founding film d'auteur was undertaken by the creators of Dogme95.

Definition 
The genre to which film d'auteur belongs implies a certain control of the filmmaker over his film from an artistic and dramatic point of view, considering in particular that a film can only be a film d'auteur if the director has control of the final edit (the famous final cut). For many critics, an auteur recognizes himself before all in his personal universe. The auteur's signature is immediate and is detected, for example, in the type of story or characters favored, the choice of recurring actors, or the aesthetic options repeated from one film to another (light, frame, sound design, transitions, movements of camera, etc.). An auteur thus stays faithful to himself but can take his work in new directions. A simplified vision of auteur cinema tends to consider that the director must also be the screenwriter, without which he could not claim the complete paternity of his work. According to another restrictive representation, a film d'auteur should imperatively be an independent film, experimental or difficult to access, and produced outside the system of studios and commissioned works. He would set himself in opposition to the "Cinéma de Genre" films that use a coded structure and conform to the norms of commercial exploitation. This conception of auteur cinema can however seem paradoxical since certain filmmakers qualified as auteurs have filmed some genre films, for example science-fiction films (Alphaville by Jean-Luc Godard, Fahrenheit 451 by François Truffaut) or detective films (Police by Maurice Pialat). Note that these auteurs have often met with success and were financed or distributed by majors like Gaumont for Truffaut, Godard, Pialat, and André Téchiné.

Current Usage 
In the media for the general public, the film d'auteur is frequently opposed to "cinéma commercial", the first being considered demanding, intellectual, elitist and with a reduced budget while the second is destined for the greatest number or claims to be familial, entertaining, and is produced with significant means. For certain critics, the concept of film d'auteur takes on a qualitative value and becomes a label. Conversely, for some viewers, film d'auteur evokes an austere and boring type of film.

Critics 
The term "auteurisme" is sometimes used, notably by Noël Burch, to qualify the ensemble of what he judges to be the downward slide of auteur films (especially French): falsely demanding attitudes, clichés and visual tics linked to a modernism, a hermeticism and a lazy formalism, openly disdaining the script. In its December 2012 issue, Les Cahiers du cinéma propose a certain number of measures to counter the "ten flaws" of contemporary auteur cinema that it lists and defines (cult of the master, seriousness of a priest, interchangeable actors, non-scenes of montage, etc.).

Related Festivals 
Certain festivals specialize in films d'auteur. The Festival international du film francophone de Namur (the FIFF) gives its selection to films d'auteur from the French-speaking world. The international festival of film d'auteur of Rabat seeks meanwhile to highlight independent auteurs. In addition, the biggest international film festivals like Cannes, Venice, Berlin, Locarno, and San Sebastian do not hide their intention to enhance the value, through their selections, of cinéma d'auteur, cinéma d'art et d'essai, and research film.

Notes and References

See also 
 Independent film
 Experimental film
 Politique des auteurs

External links 
 Cinéphiles en France

Film and video terminology